Colin F Porter (11 October 193021 August 2020) was a British rower. He competed in the men's coxless four event at the 1960 Summer Olympics. He also represented England and won a gold medal in the coxed four at the 1958 British Empire and Commonwealth Games in Cardiff, Wales. Four years later he won double bronze in the coxed four and eights at the 1962 British Empire and Commonwealth Games held in Perth, Western Australia.

References

1930 births
2020 deaths
British male rowers
Olympic rowers of Great Britain
Rowers at the 1960 Summer Olympics
Rowers from Greater London
Commonwealth Games medallists in rowing
Rowers at the 1958 British Empire and Commonwealth Games
Rowers at the 1962 British Empire and Commonwealth Games
Commonwealth Games gold medallists for England
Commonwealth Games bronze medallists for England
Medallists at the 1958 British Empire and Commonwealth Games
Medallists at the 1962 British Empire and Commonwealth Games